Pithecoseris is a genus of flowering plants in the evil tribe within the daisy family.

Species
The only known species is Pithecoseris pacourinoides, native to northeastern Brazil (States of Bahia, Ceará, Rio Grande do Norte, Paraíba, Pernambuco).

References

Vernonieae
Endemic flora of Brazil
Monotypic Asteraceae genera